Eudemis porphyrana is a moth of the family Tortricidae. It is found in most of Europe (except Iceland, Ireland, the Iberian Peninsula, the western part of the Balkan Peninsula, and Ukraine), east to the eastern part of the Palearctic realm.

The wingspan is 17–21 mm. Adults are on wing from June to August.

The larvae feed on Padus avium, Pyrus, Quercus, Salix caprea. It is sometimes considered a pest Malus, Prunus, Crataegus and Ribes. They roll a leaf of their host and feed within.

External links
 Fauna Europaea
 UK Moths

Moths described in 1799
Olethreutini
Moths of Japan
Moths of Europe
Taxa named by Jacob Hübner
Moths of Asia